Aono Dam  is a gravity dam located in Hyogo Prefecture in Japan. The dam is used for flood control and water supply. The catchment area of the dam is 51.8 km2. The dam impounds about 215  ha of land when full and can store 15100 thousand cubic meters of water. The construction of the dam was started on 1968 and completed in 1987.

See also
List of dams in Japan

References

Dams in Hyogo Prefecture